Basemath (Arabic: بسمة; "Sweet-smile"), in the Hebrew Bible, is one of the wives of Esau.

In , Basemath is the name of the first wife of Esau. She was the daughter of Elon the Hittite. Because Basemath was a Canaanite, Esau’s marriage to Basemath (as well as to his second wife, Judith) ignored God's wishes that Abraham’s descendants keep themselves separate from the Canaanites in marriage. Esau’s marriage to Basemath, therefore, brought bitterness to Isaac and Rebekah. Esau is then said to have taken as his third wife a daughter of his uncle Ishmael, Mahalath.

In , on the other hand, Esau's three wives are differently named; his family is mentioned as composed of two Canaanite wives, Adah, the daughter of Elon the Hittite, and Aholibamah, and a third: Bashemath, Ishmael's daughter. Some scholars equate the three wives mentioned in Genesis 26 and 28 with those in Genesis 36, the following way:

 Basemath = Adah, the daughter of Elon the Hittite;
 Judith = Aholibamah, also a Canaanite;
 Mahalath = Bashemath, Esau's cousin and third wife, daughter of Ishmael.

See also

 In , Basemath is also the name of a daughter of King Solomon.

References

Edomite people
Book of Genesis people
Esau
Women in the Hebrew Bible